Qarah Daraq may refer to:
 Qarah Daraq-e Olya (disambiguation)
 Qarah Daraq-e Sofla
 Qarah Daraq-e Vosta